Annalisa Tardino (born 30 April 1979 in Licata) is an Italian politician who was elected as a Member of the European Parliament in 2019.

She has been the parliament’s LIBE rapporteur on the European Commission’s proposal for a European Health Data Space.

References

1979 births
Living people
MEPs for Italy 2019–2024
21st-century women MEPs for Italy
Lega Nord MEPs